The FIBA Oceania Championship for Women 1993 was the qualifying tournament of FIBA Oceania for the 1994 FIBA World Championship for Women. The tournament was held in Auckland. New Zealand won its first Oceania Championship to qualify for the World Championship.

Results

Championship

External links
 FIBA Archive

FIBA Oceania Championship for Women
Championship
1993 in New Zealand basketball
1993 in Samoan sport
International basketball competitions hosted by New Zealand
Australia women's national basketball team games
New Zealand women's national basketball team games
basketball